Arthur Hendryckx (26 June 1891 – 1977) was a Belgian racing cyclist. He rode in the 1924 Tour de France.

References

1891 births
1977 deaths
Belgian male cyclists
Place of birth missing